The 2019–20 Cupa României is the 17th season of the annual Romanian primary football knockout tournament. It was cancelled due to the 2019-20 coronavirus pandemic during the Round of 16.

Participating clubs
The following 40 teams qualified for the competition:

Round dates

Source:

First round
16 Liga III teams entered the competition for the First Round. The 8 matches in this round were initially scheduled on Sunday, 6 October. One match was played in advance on Saturday 5 October, another was postponed until the following Wednesday, on 9 October. One match was cancelled following the withdrawal of ACS Viitorul Reghin, while the rest of 5 were played according to the original schedule.

Second Round/ Round of 32
The 8 teams that advanced from the First Round were joined by the remaining teams: 1 Liga III team, 11 Liga II teams and 12 Liga I teams, for a total of 32 teams playing 16 matches. The matches were scheduled to be played on or around 10 November. One was played well in advance, on 30 October 2019, while two on Friday 8 November, one more on 9 November, and two were postponed to 20 November. 10 games were played on the original scheduled day of 10 November.

Third round/ Round of 16
The 8 matches were scheduled to be played on 29 February. However, only 7 games were played, as one was postponed to initially to 14 March, then indefinitely, due to the 2019-20 coronavirus pandemic.

References

Romania
Cupa României seasons